Brandon A. Larracuente (born November 16, 1994) is an American actor known for his roles in Bloodline, 13 Reasons Why, and the Freeform drama series Party of Five. Since 2022, he has a recurring role on the medical drama series The Good Doctor.

Personal life 
Brandon Larracuente was born in Pleasantville, New York. At the age of four, he was introduced to theater when asked to be a part of two operas at the New Rochelle Opera House. He began acting at the age of eight, where he starred in an Off Broadway show called Desire. Upon relocating to Florida, he starred in Charlie and the Chocolate Factory and It's a Wonderful Life at the Orlando Repertory Theatre.

Filmography

Film

Television

References

External links

1994 births
21st-century American male actors
American male film actors
American male television actors
Living people
Male actors from New York (state)